Hwangaksan is a mountain of South Korea. It has an elevation of 1,111 metres.

See also
List of mountains of Korea

References

Mountains of South Korea
One-thousanders of South Korea